Claude Mondésert (?-1990) was a French Jesuit at Fourvière, Lyon and co-founder (with Jean Daniélou and Henri de Lubac) of the Sources Chrétiennes collection. He specialised in the work of the early Christian thinker, Clement of Alexandria, several volumes of which he edited or translated in this series.

He participated in a Colloquium held 1977 in Lyon concerning the persecution of Christians in Lugdunum in the year 177.

References
Clément d'Alexandrie, Les Stromates, Stromate IV (Sources Chrétiennes no.463), Paris, 2001
Claude Mondésert, Conclusions, in: CNRS (Ed.), Les martyrs de Lyon (Colloques internationaux du centre national de la recherche scientifique, N. 575), Paris 1978, p. 311-321.

20th-century French writers
French religious writers
20th-century French Jesuits
Year of birth missing
1990 deaths
20th-century French translators
French male writers
20th-century male writers